Cynet is a cyber-security company. It converges essential cyber security technologies that helps enterprises to identify security loopholes and threat intelligence, and manage endpoint security. It was founded in 2015 in Tel-Aviv, Israel, and is headquartered in Boston, United States.

History 
Eyal Gruner and Netanel Amar are the co-founders of Cynet.

In 2015, a team of researchers from Cynet and BugSec discovered vulnerabilities in Next Generation Firewalls. In 2016, they discovered major security problem in LG G3 smartphones, leaving millions of devices at risk.

In June 2018, Cynet received $13 million in investment from Ibex Investors, Norwest Venture Partners, and Shlomo Kramer.

In March 2021, Cynet raised a 40 million dollar Series C funding round.

Cynet 360 
Cynet 360 Incidence Response Tool is an all-in-one breach protection platform of Cynet which uses machine learning, artificial intelligence, and automation to manage vulnerabilities, threat intelligence, analyze user behavior, and give endpoint protection within a centrally unified system. It supports SaaS, IaaS, hybrid, and on-premises deployments.

Awards

References

External links 
Official Website

Technology companies of Israel
Software companies of Israel
Companies
Security companies of Israel
Technology companies established in 2015
Computer security companies